Magaya Corporation is a logistics software company founded in 2001 in Miami, Florida. Magaya Corporation's core business is logistics software development for the logistics industry. Offices are located in Miami, Florida.

History
Magaya Corporation was founded in 2001 by Gabriel T. Ruz Jr., José Yoniel García, and Jesus David Rodriguez.  Both Jesus David Rodriguez and Jose Yoniel Garcia received their engineering degrees from the Superior Institute of Technology (ISPJAE) in Havana, Cuba.

The first software product was originally called the Magaya Cargo System Pro until version 6.0 when it was changed to the Magaya Cargo System. Users of the software include freight forwarders, NVOCCs (non-vessel owning common carriers), consolidators, warehouse providers, cargo airlines, import and export companies, distributors, and other logistics providers. As a growing business in the Doral area of Miami, the Miami Herald featured Magaya Corporation in its "Neighbors" section on September 1, 2005.

In 2007, two additional software programs were released, Magaya WMS, a warehouse management system, and the Magaya Supply Chain Solution. Use of the WMS program is referred to in an Industry Week article. In 2008 the company developed the Magaya Commerce System,  software specifically for wholesalers, distributors, exporters and importers.

Magaya Corporation is a member of the Florida Customs Brokers & Forwarders Association.

Plug-ins for Magaya software add functions such as online tracking, scanning VIN barcodes, and communicating with ocean carriers via INTTRA Inc. INTTRA Inc. provides e-commerce solutions to the ocean freight industry. The software also connects to the U.S. Customs Automated Commercial System (ACE) for electronic filing of the required Electronic Export Information (EEI). Filing of import shipments can be done to comply with U.S. Customs regulations such as the Importer Security Filing requirement, also known as the 10 + 2 initiative. There are additional products for tracking inventory and shipping transactions on smart phones  and other programs for warehouse bar code scanning and for attaching photographs. The software enables counting inventory in a warehouse. The types of counts are described in an article in the September 2015 Material Handling News website and print magazine.

Acquisitions
In August 2020, Magaya announced the acquisition of ACELYNK, a provider of automation commercial environment (ACE-certified) automated broker interface (ABI) customs compliance software for the logistics industry. The following month, in September 2020, Magaya announced that it acquired Catapult, a provider of freight rate management software for freight forwarders, NVOCCs, carriers, and others in the logistics industry.

Awards
The Magaya Network was awarded the 2005 IT Leadership Award in Florida. ITFlorida.org, Inc. is an umbrella, not-for-profit, membership organization that represents Florida's diverse technology community on a statewide basis. The Magaya Network is the B2B infrastructure of Magaya software that enables online access for tracking and connects Magaya users so they can exchange international shipping transactions.

The company was selected as a Top 100 IT Solutions Provider in 2011 by Inbound Logistics magazine.

Magaya WMS was included in the Inbound Logistics WMS Directory for 2010 and 2011.

In 2012, Magaya was given the "Firm Of The Year" award by The Florida Customs Brokers and Forwarders Association (FCBF).

In 2020, Magaya Supply Chain was named a Leader in Warehouse Management Software by G2.com.

Community Involvement
Magaya Corporation has contributed its software to several institutions of higher learning to give students hands-on experience for jobs in the logistics industry.

Schools include:

 The New Professions Technical Institute in Miami, Florida, which is using the software in their Import/Export certificate program.
 The University of North Florida in Jacksonville began using the Magaya Supply Chain Solution software in their flagship Transportation and Logistics Program at the Coggin College of Business in 2011.
 Florida International University (FIU) in Miami, Florida, began using Magaya software in business and engineering classes in the Fall of 2015.

References

Software companies based in Florida
Companies based in Miami